Aspen Hall is a historic plantation house located near Pittsboro, Chatham County, North Carolina. The original section was built in the 1790s, and took its present form between about 1830 and 1840. It is a two-story, weatherboarded gable roofed Federal style frame house, with a Greek Revival style facade.  It was built by Joseph John "Chatham Jack" Alston, who enslaved as many as 163 people and also built the nearby Alston-DeGraffenried Plantation.

It was listed on the National Register of Historic Places in 1982.

See Elias Hall for a description of who built this house.

References

Houses completed in 1840
Houses on the National Register of Historic Places in North Carolina
Georgian architecture in North Carolina
Federal architecture in North Carolina
Greek Revival houses in North Carolina
Houses in Chatham County, North Carolina
Plantation houses in North Carolina
National Register of Historic Places in Chatham County, North Carolina
Pittsboro, North Carolina